Gordon Cramond (19 March 1949 – 1989) was a Scottish professional footballer who played as a midfielder.

Career
Born in Aberdeen, Cramond played for Dundee, Montrose, St Johnstone, Ayr United, Kilmarnock and Brechin City.

He moved from Montrose, where he was Player of the Year in 1971, to St Johnstone in 1974 for a fee of £10,000.

References

1949 births
1989 deaths
Scottish footballers
Dundee F.C. players
Montrose F.C. players
St Johnstone F.C. players
Ayr United F.C. players
Kilmarnock F.C. players
Brechin City F.C. players
Scottish Football League players
Association football midfielders
Scottish Football League representative players